The Spoils (Spoils of War, Earnings, Savings, Profits) is the eighth chapter (sūrah) of the Quran, with 75 verses (āyāt). Regarding the timing and contextual background of the revelation (asbāb al-nuzūl), it is a "Medinan surah", completed after the Battle of Badr. It forms a pair with the next surah, At-Tawba.

According to the eminent Muslim philosopher Abul A'la Maududi, the chapter was probably revealed in 2 A. H. after the Battle of Badr, the first defensive clash between Meccans and Muslim people  of Medina after they fled from persecution in Mecca . As it contains an extensive point-by-point survey of the Battle, it gives the idea that most presumably it was uncovered at very much the same time. Yet, it is additionally conceivable that a portion of the verse concerning the issues emerging because of this Battle may have been uncovered later and joined at the best possible spots to make it a consistent entirety.

Name 
The Surah is named Al-Anfal (The Bounties) from the first ayat. The word utilized in the ayat is الْأَنفَالِ. The word أَنفَال alludes to what is given as an extra sum past what is required. A very subtle perspective is covered in employing this word: the reward of undertaking jihad for God is permanently saved with God. Other than this prize, the spoils of war that are picked up from the Unbelievers are an extra offer for such individuals; before the Day of Judgment, the Almighty awards these to the participants of the war.

Exegesis 

The surah articulates general standards of war (one part of Jihad) and harmony while checking on the Battle of Badr and uses them for the ethical preparation of the Muslims as is this incredible Battle that has been evaluated right now. In any case, let it be noticed that in certain regards this survey is very unique concerning the audits that are typically made by the common commandants after an extraordinary triumph. Rather than bragging over the triumph, the ethical shortcomings that had risen to the top in that endeavor have been called attention to with the goal that the Muslims should attempt their best to change themselves. It has been put forth for them that the triumph was because of the accomplishment of Allah preferably - over to their valor and dauntlessness so the Muslims ought to figure out how to depend on Him and obey Allah and His Messenger alone. The ethical exercise of the contention between the Truth and falsehood has been articulated and the characteristics which lead to achievement in a contention have been clarified. At that point, the Surah addresses the mushriks and the unbelievers. It additionally gives guidelines for the spoils of war. The Muslims have been advised not to view these as their privilege however as an abundance from Allah. Along these lines, they ought to acknowledge with appreciation the offer that is allowed to them out of it and enthusiastically acquiesce to the offer which Allah separates for His motivation and the assistance of the penniless. At that point, it likewise gives typical directions concerning the laws of harmony and war as these were highly needed to be clarified at the phase which the Islamic Movement had entered. It charged that the Muslims should distance from the ways of "ignorance" in harmony and war and in this way ought to set up their ethical predominance on the planet. It additionally implied, to exhibit to the world in genuine useful life the ethical quality which it had been lecturing the world from the earliest starting point of Islam and had been charging that down to earth life ought to be founded on the equivalent. It additionally expresses a few articles of the Islamic Constitution which help separate the status of the Muslims living inside the restrictions of Dar-ul-Islam (the Abode of Islam) from that of the Muslims living past its cutoff points.

Text narratives 
This subject of this Surah can be considered to be the issue of Jihad.

Verse 8:12 

Tafsir Ibn Kathir says this means, "you -- angels -- support the believers, strengthen their (battle) front against their enemies, thus, implementing My command to you. I will cast fear, disgrace and humiliation over those who defied My command and denied My Messenger".

Verse 8:17
Muhammad al-Baqir narrates in hadith that:

which refers to the relatives of the Messenger of Allah.  "Al-Khums (one fifth) belongs to Allah, the Messenger and to us (his Ahl al-Bayt)".  One source states that Ubay ibn Khalaf was ransomed after Badr, but was killed by Muslims with a spear in the Battle of Uhud (625 CE). Verse  was revealed in this occasion.

Verses 8:42 and 8:47
The Battle of Badr is also the subject of this Surah, which details military conduct and operations.  Though the Surah does not name Badr, it describes the battle several times:

These verses highlighted both the chance encounter of the battle (both sides had blundered into each other) as well as the underestimation of both the size of the Meccan army by the Muslims and the fierceness of the Muslim army by the Meccans. The Meccan army was described in the second verses, and "Satan" may be referring to Amr ibn Hishām, who was hated by the Muslims and allegedly pushed for the battle repeatedly.

Verses 8:172
According to Al-Suyuti, the aftermath of the battle of Uhud had several implication for the Companions of the Prophet as some of them though they can inherit the wealth of the fallen, due to the previous bonding between Muhajirun and Ansar in the event of Brotherhood among the Sahabah. This case were highlighted in a Hadith of such event  when Ka'b ibn Malik, a Medinan Ansari warrior who has fallen during the battle and previously bonded brotherhood with Zubayr ibn al-Awwam. Then Muhammad revealed Sura Al-Anfal, Ayah , which annulled the inheritance rights between fabricated "brotherhood", and forbidding Zubayr to inherit Ka'b wealths, as the one who truly has the right to inherit his wealth were his true blood relatives such as his children's.

Appendix

Notes

References

Bibliography

External links 
Quran 8 Clear Quran translation

Islam articles needing attention
Anfal
Jihad
Battle of Badr